The Railway Hotel is a pub in Southend-on-Sea, Essex, England. It is known for its live music and its vegan food. The pub launched a meat-free menu in 2012, later making a solely vegan menu. English guitarist Wilko Johnson, David Bowie & Iggy Pop collaborator Geoff MacCormack and Teenage Fanclub drummer Brendan O'Hare have been known to attend the pub regularly. In 2013 the pub replaced their traditional pub sign with a hand-painted portrait of Wilko Johnson by local artist Jack Melville.

History 

After the London, Tilbury and Southend Railway [LTSR] was completed in 1856, the railway developer leased the adjoining forty acres of land between the coast and the new railway for a new housing development; the Cliff Town.

Situated west of the existing Georgian Royal Terrace, the mid-Victorian estate was constructed by Banks and Barry between 1859-1861. Nelson Street was designed as the estate’s shopping arcade, and The Railway Hotel was built alongside shortly before 1872. The Railway Hotel remains part of the Clifftown Conservation Area.

The three storey Victorian building was given an extensive refit by Charringtons in the inter-war years. It still retains the original counter and english oak bar top, bar back fitting, panelled walls, and parquet floor. Charringtons' tiled apron also remains around the base of the counter. A vestibule entrance on the Nelson Street side with stained glass windows and the mosaic floors in the lobby on the Nelson Street side are survivors from the original Victorian build.

In 2007, local musician Dave Dulake and his wife Fi Dulake oversaw a £50,000 refurbishment of the Railway turning it into a bohemian mainstay for the Southend musical and artistic communities. Reopening in October 2007, the new-look Railway reintroduced period features such as the parquet flooring and original mosaic tiles, which had spent decades under thick carpet. Extensive work was put in to restructure the first floor rooms into one large musical venue, which has since seen performances by local bands and international names such as Dick Valentine, Earl Slick and Slim Jim Phantom. The pub introduced regular Jazz nights, and also regularly showed super 8 chromos films on vintage equipment.

In late 2018 the business ran into financial difficulty and was put up for sale. In a crowdfunding effort endorsed by Wilko Johnson in which he described the Railway as "the heart of the town's creative community"  adding "There's a unique cultural thing that Southend has got and the Railway really represents that"  the pub's community raised over £12,000 to save the venue from closure.

In mid 2019, the pub came under the new management of James Vessey-Miller, a local Green Party politician and community activist.

In April 2021 it was announced that the venue would close due to the "unbearable pressures" of the coronavirus pandemic. James Vessey-Miller, manager of the iconic venue, announced the sad news on Twitter last night (April 6), explaining that The Railway has "run out of steam" and that the company that facilitates the business has drawn to a grinding halt.

Mr Vessey-Miller added that the company has collapsed under the weight of "unbearable pressures and almost un-tradable circumstances".

Vegan cuisine 
In 2012, the pub chose to offer a meat-free menu, rapidly becoming popular with the town’s vegetarian and vegan communities. In late 2015, the Railway Hotel was ranked in the UK’s top 10 vegan pubs by animal rights charity PETA for its varied selection of high quality vegan food. In 2018, it was also listed in the top 12 of the best Vegan Fish & Chips in the UK by Vegan Food & Living.

In late 2018, due to financial difficulty the pub's kitchen reduced its vegan menu to pizza and pasta dishes.

Awards 

In 2019, the Railway won the TripAdvisor Hall of Fame Certificate for five consecutive years of top marks from reviewers.

Radio stations 
The Railway Hotel is home to the studios of two Southend-based alternative internet Radio stations.

 Ship Full of Bombs; has been a community-run station since 2012, founded on the principles of showcasing local talent and never play-listing. It is named after the SS Richard Montgomery – an American liberty ship which sunk off the coast of Sheerness in 1944 with 1400 tonnes of munitions on board. 
 Ray Independent Radio; which is a not-for-profit volunteer-run internet radio broadcaster founded in 2017.

References

Pubs in Essex
Buildings and structures in Southend-on-Sea
Music in Essex